Anolis roosevelti, also known commonly as the Virgin Islands giant anole, Roosevelt's giant anole or the Culebra giant anole, is an extremely rare or possibly extinct species of lizard of the genus Anolis in the family Dactyloidae. The species is native to the Virgin Islands and Vieques.

Taxonomy and etymology
The Culebra Island giant anole was first described in 1931 by American zoologist Chapman Grant, grandson of U.S. President Grant. It is named in honor of Theodore Roosevelt Jr., who was the governor of Puerto Rico at that time. It was initially described as Anolis roosevelti, but some have suggested it should be transferred into the genus Xiphosurus in 2012. This new classification system is controversial and many have preferred to maintain all anoles in genus Anolis.

Geographic range
Anolis roosevelti is endemic to Culebra Island in Puerto Rico, and the Virgin Islands.

Habitat
A. roosevelti lives in forested zones on the slopes of Mt. Resaca.

Description
The color of the body is brown-grey, while the tail has a yellow-brown hue and the abdomen is whitish. The throat fan varies from gray on the upperparts to yellow on the underparts, and the eyelids are yellow. A further feature are two long drawn-out lines on both sides of the body; one starts at the ear, the other at the shoulder.

Reproduction
A. roosevelti is oviparous.

Threats
Though A. roosevelti was only observed again in 1932 after its discovery, there have been unconfirmed sightings since 1973 (the last one in 1978). Some experts believe that it might still exist. It preferred a habitat with gumbo-limbo and ficus trees because it fed from the fruits of the trees. Due to human activities the habitat was almost destroyed; only a few specimens of the Culebra Giant Anole can be seen in museums. It was listed as federally endangered in the Endangered Species Act in 1977.

See also

Fauna of Puerto Rico
List of endemic fauna of Puerto Rico

References

Further reading
Grant C (1931). "A New Species and Two New Subspecies of the Genus Anolis ". Journal of the Department of Agriculture of Porto Rico 15 (3): 219–222. (Anolis roosevelti, new species, p. 219).
Schwartz A, Thomas R (1975). A Check-list of West Indian Amphibians and Reptiles. Carnegie Museum of Natural History Special Publication No. 1. Pittsburgh, Pennsylvania: Carnegie Museum of Natural History. 216 pp. (Anolis roosevelti, p. 99).

External links

Culebra Island Giant Anole
U.S. Fish and Wildlife Service Division of Endangered Species - Culebra Island Giant Anole 
Giant Puerto Rico Lizard listed as Endangered Species

Anoles
Lizards of the Caribbean
Reptiles of Puerto Rico
Culebra, Puerto Rico
Critically endangered fauna of North America
Critically endangered fauna of the United States
Reptiles described in 1931
Taxa named by Chapman Grant
ESA endangered species